Microsphaera penicillata is a plant pathogen that causes powdery mildew on sycamore.

It also affects certain species of Corylus including Corylus sieboldiana, Corylus colurna and Corylus heterophylla.

References

External links 
 Index Fungorum
 USDA ARS Fungal Database

Fungal tree pathogens and diseases
Microsphaera
Fungi described in 1815